Beetaloo Valley is a locality in the Mid North region of South Australia in the southern Flinders Ranges. The Beetaloo Reservoir is in the centre of the locality.

References

Towns in South Australia